Between 1639 and 1651 English overseas possessions were involved in the Wars of the Three Kingdoms, a series of civil wars and wars that were fought in and between England, Scotland and in Ireland.

Americas 
At the beginning of the war, fifty thousand Englishmen inhabited some twenty colonies in the Americas.  Most of the colonies were founded in the decade prior to the start of the English Civil War (1642–1651) with the oldest existing being the Colony of Virginia (1607) and Bermuda (1609).  The vast majority of the adult population were first generation settlers and thousands returned to the British Isles to fight or involve themselves in the politics of the Commonwealth of England (1649–1660).

Although the newer, Puritan settlements in North America, most notably Massachusetts, were dominated by Parliamentarians, the older colonies sided with the Crown. Starting with Bermuda, six colonies recognized Charles II after the regicide in 1649, including: Antigua, Barbados, Virginia, Maryland, and Newfoundland. The Parliamentarians were busy subduing Royalists in Scotland, Ireland, the Isles of Scilly, the Isle of Man, and the Channel Islands, and could not immediately force their rule on the colonies. The Virginia Company's settlements, Bermuda and Virginia (Bermuda's Independent Puritans were expelled, settling the Bahamas under William Sayle), as well as Antigua and Barbados were conspicuous in their loyalty to the Crown, and were singled out by the Rump Parliament in An Act for prohibiting Trade with the Barbadoes, Virginia, Bermuda and Antego, which was passed on the 35th October 1650. This stated that due punishment [be] inflicted upon the said Delinquents, do Declare all and every the said persons in Barbada's, Antego, Bermuda's and Virginia, that have contrived, abetted, aided or assisted those horrid Rebellions, or have since willingly joyned with them, to be notorious Robbers and Traitors, and such as by the Law of Nations are not to be permitted any maner of Commerce or Traffique with any people whatsoever; and do forbid to all maner of persons, Foreiners, and others, all maner of Commerce, Traffique and Correspondency whatsoever, to be used or held with the said Rebels in the Barbada's, Bermuda's, Virginia and Antego, or either of them.

The Act also authorised Parliamentary privateers to act against English vessels trading with the rebellious colonies: All Ships that Trade with the Rebels may be surprized. Goods and tackle of such ships not to be embezeled, till judgement in the Admiralty.; Two or three of the Officers of every ship to be examined upon oath. A fleet was also assembled to take control of these colonies.  By 1652, all were brought into line by the Commonwealth.

The new government introduced mercantilism with the first of the Navigation Acts in 1651.  Soon the colonies became embroiled in the First Anglo-Dutch War (1652–1654) and the Anglo-Spanish War (1654–1660).  By the Stuart Restoration, new colonies were added and the colonial population quadrupled to over two hundred thousand due to exiles, refugees, prisoners, and the Atlantic slave trade.  In all the colonies, which later became part of the United States, population growth throughout this period was vigorous, growing from a population of about 25,000 in 1640 to around 75,000 in 1660.  The colonies also became more ethnically and religiously diverse.  Another effect was the establishment of colonial assemblies in most of the colonies.

The Caribbean 
Barbados, the second most populous colony, experienced a division between Royalists and Parliamentarians during the civil war.  The words "Roundhead" and "Cavalier" were banned to maintain peace.  After the regicide, the Royalists gained control of the colonial assembly.  Lord Willoughby was appointed Governor of Barbados, by Charles II in May 1650 and he banished the Roundheads.  During this time he also sent a small colonizing party to Suriname, which established Fort Willoughby (now Paramaribo) in honor of the governor.  The colony, now cut off from England, relied on trading with the Dutch Republic.  This became the motivation for the 1651 Navigation Act.

On October 25, 1651, a seven ship force under Commodore George Ayscue arrived off Barbados, demanding that the island submit "for the use of the Parliament of England". Willoughby's reply (tellingly addressed to "His Majesty's ship Rainbow") was unyielding, declaring that he knew "no supreme authority over Englishmen but the King". With some 400 horsemen and 6,000 militia, he was prepared to resist any attempt at coercion.

Over the next month Barbados was blockaded. Dutch ships were seized, an act which would be one of the causes of the First Anglo-Dutch War. In early December, with the Royalist cause defeated in England, Ayscue began a series of raids against fortifications on the island and was reinforced by a group of thirteen ships bound for Virginia. On December 17 a force of more than 1,000 Barbadian militia was defeated by one of Ayscue's detachments. Governor Willoughby attempted to stem the spread of Parliamentary sympathies by hanging two of the returning militia soldiers and prohibiting the reading of documents from the blockading fleet. The Royalists held out for several more weeks until one of Willoughby's own commanders, Sir Thomas Modyford the assembly speaker, declared himself for Parliament. A battle was averted by a week of rain, after which Willoughby, perhaps having seen the hopelessness of his cause, sought negotiations. He was replaced as governor but Barbados and the Royalists there were not punished.

News of the fall of Barbados shocked the other Royalist colonies.  Each of the other five soon  capitulated without resistance, when Ayscue's fleet arrived to replace their governments.  Following the conquest of Scotland and Ireland by the Commonwealth, Irish prisoners, and a smaller number of Scottish and English Royalists, were sent to the islands as indentured servants and became known as Redlegs.

In 1655, Cromwell sealed an alliance with the French against the Spanish. He sent a fleet to the West Indies under Admiral William Penn, with some 3,000 soldiers under the command of General Robert Venables, which was further reinforced in Barbados, Montserrat, St. Kitts and Nevis.  Penn and Venables decided to lay siege to Santo Domingo but failed, because the Spanish had improved their defences in the face of Dutch attacks earlier in the century.

Weakened by fever, the English force then sailed west for Jamaica, the only place where the Spanish did not have new defensive works.  In May 1655 they invaded at a place called Santiago de la Vega, now Spanish Town.  They came, and they stayed, in the face of prolonged local resistance, reinforced by troops sent from New Spain in the Battle of Ocho Rios (1657) and the Battle of Rio Nuevo (1658).  For England, Jamaica was to be the 'dagger pointed at the heart of the Spanish Empire' as it became the base for buccaneers.  Cromwell, despite all difficulties, was determined that the presence should remain, sending reinforcements and supplies.  Jamaica remained an English colony despite the exiled king's promise to return it to Spain in the event of his Restoration.

The Chesapeake Colonies and Bermuda 
The colonies of Virginia, Bermuda (an archipelago nearest to what is now Cape Hatteras, North Carolina, which was historically part of the colony of Virginia, then a separate colony administered with the continental colonies of British (North) America, and - after the independence of the colonies that were to form the United States - would become part of British North America), and Maryland had strong Royalist sympathies, owing to their origins and demographics.  Virginia, the oldest and third most populous colony, was turned into a crown colony in 1624 when the Royal charter of the Virginia Company was revoked. It was mostly High Church Anglican in religion. Bermuda, originally an extension of Virginia and at the time still administered by the Virginia Company's spin-off the Somers Isles Company, had many Puritans, but its Government and society were dominated by Royalists. The much smaller Maryland was a proprietary colony founded by Roman Catholic gentry, supported by a Protestant underclass.

Bermuda, or the Somers Isles (originally named Virginiola), 640 miles from North Carolina, had been settled in 1609 by the wreck of the Sea Venture and officially colonised as an extension of Virginia in 1612. Its administration had been transferred in 1615 to the Somers Isles Company, a spin-off of the Virginia Company, but it would retain close ties to Virginia 'til the American War of Independence. The Parliament of Bermuda (originally composed of a single house, the House of Assembly) was created in 1620. As virtually all of the land in Bermuda (other than the General Land - also termed Crown or Common land - composed of St. George's Parish and small parcels primarily connected with defence needs in the other eight parishes) was owned by absentee landlords (the Adventurers of the Virginia and Somers Isles Companies) in England, with most islanders being tenants or indentured servants, there was originally no property qualification to vote for the local assembly. This resulted in an Assembly that strongly reflected the interests of Bermudians, which became increasingly at odds with those of the Adventurers in England. When the first Lieutenant-Governor of Bermuda had been appointed by the Virginia Company in 1612, several other prominent settlers had been appointed to form an advisory Privy council. With the establishment of an elected assembly, this became a Legislative council, made up of officers such as the colony's Secretary and Sheriff as ex-officio members, that acted as both a Cabinet and as an upper house to the Legislature. As all members of the council were appointed, it was presumed to be more closely-aligned with the interests of the Adventurers, but with those members having been appointed from the same emerging local elite class that provided candidates for election to the Assembly, it tended also to favour local interests.

Bermuda pioneered the cultivation of tobacco, but by the 1620s Virginia's tobacco industry was outproducing it and newer colonies were also adopting tobacco cultivation, driving down the profits the company earned from Bermudian tobacco. This resulted in many adventurers selling their Bermudian land to the occupying tenants, creating a landed class in Bermuda who were technically Adventurers in the company, but who could not vote on its policies without attending its meetings in England in person. As the Bermudians attempted to redirect their colony to animal husbandry and food crops for local subsistence with the surplus increasingly exported to other colonies, they began building their own ships to deliver produce as they were otherwise reliant on the company's magazine ships (that served only to transport Bermuda's tobacco to the company in England and to return equipment and other goods for sale to Bermudians, in an attempt to give the company complete control of the economy and a profit on all imports as well as exports). The Adventurers in England, many of whom were Parliamentarians, exerted their authority to strangle Bermuda's emerging maritime industry, and the Bermudians animosity towards the Adventurers in England consequently further acted to place them on the side of the Crown (The Somers Isles Company had tended towards the Royalist side in 1647, but was in the Parliamentary camp by 1649, and Robert Rich, 2nd Earl of Warwick, one of the major shareholders of the Somers Isles Company, was appointed Lord High Admiral of the Parliamentary navy from 1642 to 1649, and was related to Oliver Cromwell by the marriage of his grandson and heir to Cromwell's daughter), with Bermudians tending towards the Royalist side, though Bermuda largely escaped the effects of the conflict.

In a letter to Alexander Pym at Derby House, Westminster, dated 9 May 1646, William Renner wrote:

A Triumvirate replaced Captain Josias Forster as Governor of Bermuda in 1647. The members all being religious Independents, they established a minority rule that both the Episcopalians and the Presbyterians found tyrannical, resulting in their alliance against the Independents (whereas in England it had the Presbyterians had allied with the Independents under Parliament against the Royalist Episcopalians). To end the strife in the colony, the Somers Isles Company appointed Captain Thomas Turner Governor in 1647, and Independents were removed from Government.

A Somers Isles Company magazine ship, which had left England before the King's 30 January 1649 execution, arrived at Bermuda in March, 1649, bearing news of the King's impending trial. It also bore instructions from the Company stripping the moderate Royalist Captain Thomas Turner of the office of Governor (which had been filled by a succession of Bermudian settlers since the 1630s, in contrast to the company's earlier practice of dispatching governors to the colony) and ordering that the colony be governed by a triumvirate composed of the moderate Richard Norwood, Captain Leacraft (also spelt Leicroft), and Mr. Wilkinson. However, Leacraft had died before the instructions arrived, Wilkinson was a strong Independent, obnoxious to the dominant Church faction in the Council and the House of Assembly, and was not permitted by them to exercise his commission, and Norwood would not accept his own commission without Wilkinson. Captain Turner, Captain Josias Forster, and Roger Wood (all three having formerly held the office of Governor) were put forward as candidates for the Governorship, which was voted upon by the other members of the council. Although Captain Richard Jennings and the Sheriff both voted for Wood, the others all voted for Turner, who reluctantly resumed the office. Turner was too moderate for most of the Royalist party, however.

News of the execution of King Charles I reached Bermuda by July, and a proposition was made to the Governor and Council by the Country (analogous to the Royalist party) at a meeting on the 5 July 1649:

The answer of the Governor and Council to the Country's proposition was to make Bermuda the first colony to recognize Charles II as King, and included:

On the 20 August 1649, Governor Turner ordered a proclamation to be drawn up and published (dated 21 August) requiring that, as various persons in the colony had taken the oath of supremacy and alleadgiance vunto his matie the Lawfull kinge of England and yet neuertheles they contrarye to theire oathes doe deny conformity to the lawes and Government here established, all such persons who refused conformity to the Government in both the church and state could expect no protection by virtue of any former power or order, and would face prosecution. A Mr Romer and a Thomas Wilson were imprisoned the same day for refusing to take the oath of allegiance. A Mr. Hunt was summoned before the council the same month for treasonable speeches against the King, the Parliament, and the Governor. Hunt refused to accept the council's authority to question him and, having been sentenced to an hour in the pillory to be followed by imprisonment until he provided bail against his good behaviour, he refused to submit and was ordered to lie in irons until he willingly submitted.

Turner's Governorship would end after Mr. Whetenhall, in the name of the Country, impeached the Reverend Nathaniel White of the Puritan party for being an enemy of the King, Company, and country. A warrant was issued for White's arrest. On the 25th of September, 1649, the Council and Country met at the home of John Trimingham after the party in arms called 'The Country''' had arrested White under the aforementioned warrant, along with most of the Independents (who had been imprisoned in the house of a Mrs. Taylor). The Country exhibited articles against Governor Turner. Although the Council deemed the articles not to be grounds for his displacement, the Country was insistent against Turner, who therefore resigned the office of Governor. The Country then put forward John Trimingham and Thomas Burrows to the Council as candidates for Turner's replacement. The Council members elected Trimingham. On Thursday, the 27 September 1649, the Army brought downe the new Gour and he tooke his oathe in the Church according to the usuall forme and vppon ffryday they marched awaye out of the towne (of St Georges) into the mayne.

Under Independent Puritan and Cromwell-loyalist William Sayle, many of the island's defeated Puritans were forced to emigrate, settling in the Bahamas as the Eleutheran Adventurers.

The Royalists in Bermuda, with control of the army (nine companies of militia and the complements of the coastal forts), were confident in Bermuda's natural and man-made defences (including a barrier reef and numerous fortified coastal artillery batteries). The Parliamentary government, however, believed the defences weak and formed plans to capture the colony.

On the 18 December 1649, the Earl of Pembroke, Colonel Purefoy, Sir W. Constable, the Earl of Denbigh, Lord Whitelocke, Colonel Wanton, and Mr. Holland were appointed by the Council of State, with any three or more of them to be a committee with authority to examine the business of Bermuda. The Council of State Orders for the 1 January 1650, lists:

These instructions and Forster's commission arrived in Bermuda on the 29 May 1650. Although the Country made charges against Forster and Captain Jennings on learning of this, demanding their charges be answered before the commission read, and many members of the Council denied to take notice of it because the l'tre was not directed to them with the Gour as here to fore, but eventually it was agreed to read it, and Forster was accepted as Governor.

The following day, Trimingham, Mr. Miller, Captain Jennings, and Mr. Morgan accepted the oaths of Councillors. Richard Norwood, Mr. Berkeley, and Mr. Wainwright refused. Mr. Deuitt would not accept because the company deserted him.

Despite accepting the instructions from London on the matter of the new appointments, the Government of Bermuda remained Royalist.

The Reverend Mr. Hooper informed the Council that a ship under the command of Captain Powell, with Commissioners Colonel Rich, Mr. Hollond, Captain Norwood, Captain Bond, and a hundred men aboard, was prepared to seize Bermuda.

The Act prohibiting trade with Bermuda and the other colonies considered in rebellion was passed on 3 Oct, 1650.

In Bermuda, tailors Thomas Walker of Paget and George Washington of Hamilton were tried at the Assizes held from the 11 to the 22 November 1650, on charges of being traitors against our Soveraigne Lord the Kinge.

Admiral Sir George Ayscue, in command of the task force sent in 1651 by Parliament to capture the Royalist colonies, received additional instructions from Whitehall (dated 13 February 1651) addressed to him and the other Commissioners, instructing "aswell to take Care for the reducemt of Bermuda's Virginia & Antego, as of the Island of Barbada's"; "In the case that (through the blessing of God upon yor endeavors) you shall be able to recover the Island of Barbada's unto its due subjection to this Comonwealth or after you have used your utmost dilligence to effect the same. If that you finde yorselves in a Capacity to send one or more of yo ships for the reduceing of any or all of the other plantacons to the like obedience. You are hereby Authorized and required soe to doe. And you are to make yor attempt upon the Island of Bermuda's, wch it is informed may without much strength or difficulty be gained or upon any the other plantacons now in defection as your Intelligence and opportunity shall serve". The instructions also specified that the officer in command of the force that captured a colony should then become its Governor, "But if either Care of the Fleet wth you or any othar important publiq service, will not admit of his Continuance there, to exercise the office & Comand of Governor thereof then it shall be lawfull for him the said Comr or commandrs in chiefe to depute & Constitute William Wilkinson of the Island of Bermudas or some other able and faithfull person to be Governor there, and to appoint such & soe many well affected & discreet persons to be a Councell for his Assistance as he thinks fit".

Barbados would surrender on 13 January 1652, but no attempt would be made to test Bermuda's defences. At a meeting of the Governor and Council on the 25 February 1652 (at which were present Governor Forster, Council members Captain Roger Wood, Captain Richard Jennings, Captain Thomas Turner, Captain William Seymour, Mr. Stephen Painter, Mr. William Wilkinson, Mr. John Miller, Mr. William Berkeley, Mr. Richard Norwood, and Secretary Anthony Jenour), a Generall Letter received from the company was read, which instructed them to engage to the Commonwealth of England "as yt is now established without a kinge or House of Lordes", which engagement was given and a proclamation ordered by the Governor explaining and commanding all inhabitants of Bermuda to take the same engagement when it should be tendered unto them.

Before the Wars of the Three Kingdoms, the Bermudian population was composed almost entirely of persons of English descent (in particular immigrants from East Anglia and Lincolnshire). However, various conflicts in both Europe and the Americas during the 17th century would begin to rapidly alter the population by introducing new ethnic groups to the islands, as immigrants, slaves and indentured servants. The first group consisted of Irish and Scottish indentured servants, with both groups primarily consisting of prisoners of war captured during the conflict (including the Cromwellian conquest of Ireland).

The Cromwellian conquest of Ireland led to Irish captives, from both military and civilian backgrounds, being sent as indentured servants to the English colonies. This cleared Irish land for resettlement by English soldiers in lieu of cash payment, and the Puritan Commonwealth government also saw forcibly sending Catholics from Ireland to its colonies in North America and the West Indies as both assisting in their conquest of the Ireland (by removing the strongest resistance against their rule) and saving the souls of the Roman Catholic Irish servants by settling them in Protestant-dominated colonies where they would supposedly inevitably convert to the "true faith". Numerous Scottish soldiers were captured during the Parliamentarian conquest of Scotland (1650–1652), and most of them were sent as indentured servants to the English West Indies and English colonies in North America. Small numbers of Scots, relative to the Irish, were sent to Bermuda.

The second group were Native Americans from North America who were brought to Bermuda as slaves after being sold into slavery in the aftermath of various conflicts in colonial New England such as the Pequot War and King Philip's War. Small numbers of mostly enslaved black Africans and Latin Americans with African ancestry had trickled into Bermuda during the decades preceding the wars, primarily as a result of shipwrecks and captures of Spanish vessels by Bermuda-based privateers. The first substantial immigration of people with African ancestry began mid-century when indentured free people of colour from former Spanish American colonies annexed by England began immigrating under the same terms as indentured servants arriving from England.

These rapid demographic changes quickly began to alarm the dominant Anglo-Bermudian population, in particular the importation of the Irish indentured servants, most of whom were presumed to be secretly practising Catholicism (recusancy had been criminalised in Bermuda, as in the rest of the English realm). In response to the rapid influx of blacks (most having Spanish as a native language and also presumed to be Catholics) the terms of indenture for blacks being raised from seven to ninety-nine years to discourage further immigration, and free blacks would thereafter face continual pressure to emigrate (while slaveowners would also be encouraged to export slaves).

Relationships between the Anglo-Bermudian community and Irish indentured servants consistently remained hostile, resulting in the Irish responding to ostracism by ultimately merging with the Scottish, African, Native American and part of the White Anglo-Saxon Protestant communities in Bermuda to form a new demographic: the coloureds, which in Bermuda meant anyone not entirely of European descent (by 1699, Bermuda's population of 5,862 would include 3,615 white and 2,247 coloured islanders). In modern-day Bermuda, the term has been replaced by 'Black', in which wholly sub-Saharan African ancestry is erroneously implicit. The Irish quickly proved hostile to their new conditions in Bermuda, and colonial legislation soon stipulated:

In September, 1658, three Irish servants in Bermuda – John Chehen (Shehan, Sheehan, Sheene, or Sheen), David Laragen and Edmund Malony – were lashed for breaking curfew and on suspicion of stealing a boat. Jeames Benninge (a Scottish indentured servant), black Franke (a servant to John Devitt), Tomakin, Clemento, and black Dick (servants of Anne Trimingham) were also punished. In September 1660, Paget Parish constable John Hutchins complained that he had been abused and jostled by three Irishmen, who were sentenced to stand in church during the forenoon's exercise with signs on their chests detailing their crimes, and then held in the stocks until the evening's exercise began.

The following year, in 1661, the colonial government alleged that a plot was being hatched by an alliance of Blacks and Irish, one which involved cutting the throats of all Bermudians of English descent. The governor of Bermuda, William Sayle (who had returned to Bermuda after the Bermudian colonial government acknowledged the authority of Parliament) countered the alleged plot with three edicts: The first was that a nightly watch be raised throughout the colony; second, that slaves and the Irish be disarmed of militia weapons; and third, that any gathering of two or more Irish or slaves be dispersed by whipping. There were no arrests, trials or executions connected to the plot, though an Irish woman named Margaret was found to be romantically involved with a Native American; she was voted to be stigmatised and he was whipped.

The 1660 restoration of the Monarchy was to eventually enable the Bermudians to triumph over the Somers Isles Company. The islanders took their case against the company to the Crown, which (keen to re-assert its authority) gave them a sympathetic ear, resulting in the revocation of the company's Royal Charter in 1684, with the Crown taking over administration of the colony.

In April 1643, aware of the problems besetting the home-country, Governor Leonard Calvert departed Maryland to consult with his brother, Proprietor Cecil Calvert, 2nd Baron Baltimore. During this time, St. Mary's City was visited by Captain Richard Ingle, a Roundhead, who led a rebellion upon Leonard Calvert's return. In September 1644, Ingle captured St. Mary's City, and William Claiborne captured Kent Island, forcing Calvert to seek refuge in Virginia.  What followed became known as the Plundering Time, a nearly two-year period when Ingle and his companions roamed the colony, robbing at will and taking Jesuits back to England as prisoners.

Meanwhile, Virginia was battling for its survival in a war against the Powhatans (1644–1646) which saw a tenth of the colonial population killed in the initial massacre. Royalist propaganda accused the Roundheads of stirring up the natives and Governor William Berkeley expelled all the Puritans from the colony in 1647.  After Virginian victory, Calvert returned to Maryland in 1646 and recaptured St. Mary's City.

Following the death of Leonard Calvert in 1647, in 1649 Cecil Calvert named William Stone, a Protestant, as governor.  By choosing Stone, Calvert could avoid criticism of Maryland as a seat of Popery, where Protestants were allegedly oppressed.  Stone and his council, however, were required to agree not to interfere with freedom of worship.  In 1649, the colonial assembly passed the Maryland Toleration Act, ensuring freedom of religion within Maryland.

After the regicide, Virginia remained faithful to the House of Stuart, although Parliament had decreed that support for Charles II was treason.  Berkeley also invited the king to Virginia.  The issue of which side Maryland stood was finally settled, at least in appearance, when Thomas Greene, deputy to Stone and a Roman Catholic, declared on November 15, 1649, that Charles II was the "undoubted rightfull heire to all his father's dominions".  All acts taken by the Maryland Assembly would further require an oath of fidelity to Baltimore as "Lord Proprietor".

In March 1652 the Rump Parliament removed Stone and Berkeley as governors of Maryland and Virginia, Richard Bennett replaced Berkeley but Stone was reinstated in June.   On March 2, 1654, Stone decreed that although he was faithful to the Commonwealth, all writs should "run in the Proprietary's name as heretofore".
On January 3, 1654, the exiled Virginian Puritans who had settled at Stone's invitation in Providence objected to the oath as Baltimore was a Catholic.  On July 20, 1654, Stone resigned as governor under duress and fled to Virginia.
Parliamentary commissioners became de facto governors of the colony, and the first general assembly under their authority was held on October 20, 1654.  Roman Catholics and any other individuals who had borne arms against the Parliament could not be members (effectively limiting the membership to Puritans), and among the 44 Acts passed by this group was a repeal of the Toleration Act, and another that forbade Roman Catholics from practicing their faith.

On January 31, 1655, The Golden Lion, a merchant ship commanded by Captain Roger Heamans, arrived in Maryland, and Stone reported to the Captain that he was no longer Governor of Maryland.  At about that time, another ship, The Golden Fortune arrived in the colony with a letter from Oliver Cromwell, by this time Lord Protector, addressed to Captain Stone, Governor of Maryland.

Using this as a form of recognition, Stone challenged the authority of the commissioners, seized back the records of the colony, and mustered his troops to deal with the Puritan settlers allied with them. Recruiting from St. Mary's County, Stone recaptured the Assembly records located on the Patuxent River, and sailed with a small fleet up the Chesapeake Bay north towards Providence.

Heamans was informed of a plot to kill the inhabitants of Providence, as well as to burn his ship and kill his crew and officers.  Following the removal of the women and children of Providence to The Golden Lion'', a war council was convened, and appointed William Fuller of the Puritan settlers of Providence as its leader.  On March 23, 1655, the council issued a warrant to Heamans to serve as a counselor, with Heamans relating to Stone that he was bound to do so, ignoring his contrary orders.  Virginia's Richard Bennett also lent support to the Puritans.

On March 24, 1655, Heamans fired on sloops and boats heading toward his ship, forcing their retreat.  Heamans then ordered an armed sloop to bar their escape by blocking Spa Creek, the inlet of the Severn to which Stone's forces had retreated.  On March 25, after Fuller retrieved the only Commonwealth flag in the colony for use as his colors in battle, the forces met on Horn Point, with Fuller's forces driving Stone's small force to the end of the peninsula.  In less than one half hour, the battle was over, with 17 of Stone's forces being killed and 32 wounded, including Stone.  Only two of Fuller's force were killed. This event was marked as the Battle of the Severn.

Stone surrendered after he was promised mercy. Following hostilities, however, the war council issued death sentences for Stone and nine others. Four of the prisoners were executed, but the remainder were saved when the women of Providence begged that their lives be spared.

The primarily Puritan assembly retained powers until April 27, 1658, when proprietorship was restored to Lord Baltimore, religious freedom was ensured, and an agreement of general amnesty was entered into.  Thus, in the end, Lord Baltimore not only retained his lands and powers, but was able to avoid the grisly fate of many of his contemporaries in England during this time.  The proprietor appointed Josias Fendall to succeed Stone as governor for his loyalty during the battle.

Governor Fendall soon had a falling out with Lord Baltimore and led a bloodless revolution in 1659 known as Fendall's Rebellion whereby he and Fuller reorganized Maryland's government to resemble the Commonwealth's.  The proprietorship and the assembly's upper house was abolished.  However, the Restoration of Charles II in 1660 forced Fendall into exile and restored the proprietorship.

After the death of Governor Samuel Matthews, Virginia's House of Burgesses reelected the royalist William Berkeley in 1659. Thus, in the view of historian Robert Beverley, Jr. writing in 1705, Virginia colony "was the last of all the King's Dominions that submitted to the Usurpation, and afterwards the first that cast it off". Many of the First Families of Virginia trace their founding to this time period and not the actual first days of the colony.    He awarded a group of his faithful supporters the rights to found a new colony just south of Virginia, to be called Carolina after his father (its capital would be called Charleston). This was established by a nucleus of Bermudian families and new emigrants from England, who sailed from Bermuda under the same Independent William Sayle who had led the Parliamentarian and Puritan exiles from Bermuda to the Bahamas during the war.

Northern Colonies 
From 1630 through 1640 approximately 20,000 Puritans emigrated to New England in a Great Migration. In 1642, after the English Civil War began, a sixth of the male colonists returned to England to fight for Parliament, and many stayed, since Oliver Cromwell was himself a Puritan. In 1643, most of the colonies formed the New England Confederation, a defensive alliance.  In the early years of the Commonwealth, there was a pamphlet war on whether England should model itself after its Puritan colonies.  The non-Puritan factions successfully convinced Cromwell to go for religious toleration lest there be mutiny in the New Model Army.

In 1637, Baptist leader Anne Hutchinson purchased land on Aquidneck Island from the Native Americans, settling in Pocasset, now known as Portsmouth, Rhode Island. With her came her husband William Coddington and John Clarke, among others. Other neighboring settlements of refugees followed, which all formed a loose alliance. They sought recognition together as an English colony in 1643, in response to threats to their independence. The revolutionary Long Parliament in London granted a charter in March 1644. The colonists refused to have a governor, but set up an elected "president" and council.

Royalist Newfoundland fishermen, with the support of Prince Rupert, fought sea skirmishes with New Englanders until Governor David Kirke was arrested by his replacement John Treworgie in 1651.  The sparsely populated High church Anglican Province of Maine was annexed by the most populous Massachusetts Bay Colony in 1652 as the County of Yorkshire.

In 1654, the New England Confederation voted to invade New Netherland to support the Commonwealth during the First Anglo-Dutch War.  Massachusetts refused to join which severely undermined the Confederation.  Cromwell sent naval reinforcements but the war ended while they were organizing their forces.  This expedition was retooled to target Nova Scotia, the former Scottish colony that was ceded to French Acadia years earlier by Charles I.  Cromwell claimed the Treaty of Suza and Treaty of Saint-Germain were invalid and that the French did not pay the purchase money.  Nova Scotia was taken without significant resistance by Robert Sedgwick.  This became an international incident since England and France were at peace but the French were busy fighting the Spanish and ceded the territory to England to secure the Commonwealth as an ally. England returned it to France in 1670 as according to the 1667 Treaty of Breda.

After the Restoration, there was a Fifth Monarchist uprising in London led by New Englander Thomas Venner.  This was used in Royalist propaganda to unfairly blame all the upheaval of the last two decades on New England.  It was not helped by the fact that the New Haven colony sheltered several regicides.  New Haven was merged with the Connecticut Colony as punishment.  New England as a whole remained the hotbed of Puritanism where sentiments for the 'Good Old Cause' against the 'Norman yoke' simmered until the Glorious Revolution.

India 
During this period, the East India Company operated factories in Bantam, Surat, and Fort St George (Chennai).  The Commonwealth was not sympathetic to the company, seeing it as a relic of the Stuart era.  The First Anglo-Dutch War severely damaged the fortunes of the company as it had a weaker military presence in the Indian Ocean compared to their rival, the Dutch East India Company.  In 1654, the Company lost its monopoly charter.  Cromwell renewed the charter in 1657 and granted the EIC the right to govern the South Atlantic island of Saint Helena.

See also 
 Restoration (Colonies)
 English overseas possessions
 British colonization of the Americas

References 

Wars of the Three Kingdoms
 
Wars of the Three Kingdoms
Wars of the Three Kingdoms
Wars of the Three Kingdoms
Civil wars involving the states and peoples of Asia
British India
British East India Company
Wars involving India
History of Surat
History of Chennai
Colonial India